Vulsellidae is a family of bivalves belonging to the order Ostreida.

Genera:
 Crenatula Lamarck, 1803
 Electroma Stoliczka, 1871
 Vulsella Röding, 1798

References

Ostreida
Bivalve families